Togtoh County (Mongolian:   Toɣtaqu siyan, Тогтох шянь) is a county of Inner Mongolia Autonomous Region, North China, it is under the administration of the prefecture-level city of Hohhot, the capital of Inner Mongolia, located on the north bank of the Yellow River at which point that great river turns out of the Ordos Loop toward the south. It is under the administration of the regional capital of Hohhot,  to the northeast, with a population of around 166,192.

Its villages include Hekou, formerly known as Hokow and Tchagan Kouren, which was once an important caravan center on the north bend of the Yellow River.

Climate

References

www.xzqh.org 

County-level divisions of Inner Mongolia